Anacrônico (English: Anachronistic) is the second album by Brazilian rock singer Pitty. #1 in Brazil.

In 2006 the album was re-released in the DualDisc format version. It has the music video "Anacrônico", the photo gallery of their respective eponymous album and a documentary regarding your recording.

In the documentary "Sessões Anacrônicas" (Anachronistic sessions), we can check the recording sessions for the CD, conducted by Rafael Ramos (ex-Cosmic Baba). In this we can notice the relaxation and Pitty band, the satisfaction that the CD is being made of uncompromising fashion (Pitty even says that the success of the first CD did not press somehow). Call attention the work of Bahia on vocals, especially on the track "A Saideira" and in doideiras that happened in the studio.

Track listing

DualDisc version

References

2005 albums
Pitty albums